Central City is a fictional American city appearing in American comic books published by DC Comics. It is the home of the Silver Age version of the Flash (Barry Allen), and first appeared in Showcase #4 in September–October 1956.

Location
Central City's location has been vaguely defined over the years, similar to DC's other fictional cities such as Gotham City and Metropolis. In the 1970s, Central City was stated as being located in Ohio, where the real-world city of Athens, Ohio, would be (as shown in Flash  #228 in 1974). Bob Rozakis' Ask the Answer Man column also stated that Central City was located in Ohio in 1987's Flash (vol. 2) #2, published just after the reality-altering storyline Crisis on Infinite Earths.

More recently, Central City has most often been located in the state of Missouri. Maps in Young Justice place Central City in Missouri across from Keystone City, Kansas. Additionally, the 2014 television series The Flash also places Central City in Missouri (although opening scenes show Portland, Oregon), most explicitly in a letter sent to S.T.A.R. Labs in the episode "The Man in the Yellow Suit." Portland, Oregon is also the city-scape in the episode "Flash vs The Arrow" in season 1 of the series. Season 4, episode 13: True Colors mentions Central City being located in the Midwest. In season 6, episode 6, the location of Central City is shown through the targeting system of the Ring of Fire. The location points to the Richmond, Virginia metro area.

In the episode "Bloodlines" of the Young Justice cartoon, (a facsimile of) the St. Louis Gateway Arch can be seen in the background of scenes depicting Central City.

In season 7, episode 14 “Rayo de Luz”, there’s a scene where Central City is shown on a computer map as being located in Missouri.

Statistics
Central City's population has been depicted as dynamic over the years. In The Flash (vol. 2) #2 (1987) it was cited as being 290,000. In 1990, the Atlas of the DC Universe listed it as 750,000. As of Flash Secret Files and Origins 2010, the population stands as 1,395,600. In The Flash (vol. 4) #1, Central City Police Captain Darryl Frye is quoted as describing the population as having "tripled" during Barry Allen's years-long absence.

Caitlin Snow mentioned the city population as 14,000,000 in The Death of Vibe episode of The Flash (Season 5, episode 3 of the 2014 TV series).

Notable residents
From 1956 until approximately 1985 (in publishing years), Central City was defended by the Flash (police scientist Barry Allen) against a myriad of foes, including Gorilla Grodd, Captain Cold, the Weather Wizard, the Mirror Master, and Eobard Thawne (The "Reverse-Flash").

After Barry's death in Crisis on Infinite Earth, most of his foes, as well as Barry's successor (and former sidekick) Wally West moved to Keystone City, which thanks to the reality-altering effects of Crisis on Infinite Earth, was now Central City's twin city (pre-Crisis on Infinite Earth, Keystone City was located on the parallel Earth known as Earth-Two, in approximately the same space as Central City). Subsequently, Central City was treated as a relatively quiet venue that was not frequently depicted in DC comic book stories, but this situation has changed as a result of Barry Allen's recent return as the Flash.

Not long after Allen's death, in Crisis on Infinite Earths #4 (August 1987), Central City was depicted as experiencing a wave of racial violence, caused or at least exacerbated by politician and white supremacist W. James Heller; in his costumed identity of supposed super-hero William Hell, Heller captured only non-white criminals (creating the false impression that non-whites were primarily responsible for Central City's criminal activity) and recruited white criminals for his "Aryan Empire" organization. When Heller attempted to incite further violence at a political rally, Suicide Squad member Deadshot impersonated William Hell to oppose Heller's racist rhetoric, turning Heller's own charade against him, since the costumed "hero" proved more popular with the public than any politician. Heller quickly donned his costume to, as William Hell, denounce Deadshot/Hell as an impostor, and in the ensuing conflict, William Hell (Heller) was wounded and his injuries blamed on Heller's followers, partially defusing Central City's racial strife.

The robotic superhero and former Teen Titans member Cyborg has moved to Central City; part of this is hoping to establish himself as the town's resident hero.

Geography, institutions and landmarks
During the years in which the second Flash series was written by Cary Bates, Central City was apparently divided into Upper and Lower East and West Sides, as well as a "downtown" region.

Central City is the home of the Flash Museum, a museum dedicated to the exploits and memorabilia of the city's hero.

Central City's main newspaper is the Central City Citizen (previously the Central City Picture-News), for which Barry's wife is currently once again a reporter after an absence of several years.

Central City is home to the "Central City Cougars", an American Football team who is a member of the NFL's AFC Central Division.

As seen in The Flash (vol. 2) #177, it has developed a thriving theatre district, second only to New York City.

Later, much of downtown was demolished by the Rogues, acting under the orders of the other-dimensional Crime Syndicate. Due to a miscommunication and the Rogues' own decency, only property was damaged, they avoided taking lives.

In other media

Television

 Central City was the setting for the 1990 television series, The Flash.
 Central City is mentioned in the episodes "My Girl" and "Speed Demons" of Superman: The Animated Series.
 Central City appears in the Justice League episode "The Brave and the Bold".
 Central City appears in the Justice League Unlimited episode "Flash and Substance".
 Central City is referenced in Arrow episode "Salvation".  Laurel Lance's mother, Dinah, mentions catching the red-eye to Central City; "Should be home in a flash."  In the season 2 episode "The Scientist", CSI Barry Allen assists Starling City Police with a break-in and theft at a Queen Consolidated warehouse by Cyrus Gold. In "Three Ghosts", Barry returns to Central City but gets caught in an explosion from STAR Labs. In "Blast Radius", Felicity was staying in the city to check on Barry after the explosion.
 Central City is the setting for the 2014 Arrow spin-off series The Flash. According to a letter sent to S.T.A.R. Labs in the episode "The Man in the Yellow Suit", it places Central City in Missouri. Central City, like Star City, is represented by Vancouver, British Columbia. It is also represented by Portland, Oregon.
 Central City is mentioned in season one of Gotham.
 In the Supergirl episode "Worlds Finest" (a crossover episode with The Flash), Barry checks that there's a Central City in Supergirl's universe; Harrison Wells, Cisco Ramon, and Caitlin Snow apparently do not exist, and S.T.A.R. Labs was not founded as the result of Wells' absence.
 Central City was a setting in the Cartoon Network TV show Young Justice.

Film
 Central City appeared in the 2017 film Justice League. It is located in Ohio.

Video games
 Central City appears in DC Universe Online. It can be accessed if the player has the Lightning Strikes Downloadable Content.
 In Batman: Arkham Origins, on Burnley there is a billboard with the names of cities including Central City.
 Central City is referred to in Batman: Arkham Knight as Simon Stagg's place of residence. Militia soldiers mention that it is protected by a superhero, referring to the Flash.

Theme parks
 Central City appears in Justice League: Alien Invasion 3D'', a dark ride created by Sally Corporation for Warner Bros. Movie World.  It was designed by Rich Hill, Senior Designer of Sally Corp.

References

External links
 Information on Central City from the Flash fansite "Those Who Ride The Lightning"
 Central City entry on DCDatabaseProject

 
DC Comics populated places
Fictional populated places in Missouri
Fictional populated places in Ohio
Flash (comics)
1956 in comics
Fictional elements introduced in 1956